Yuri Yankelevich (Russian: Юрий Исаевич Янкелевич) (7 March 1909 – 22 September 1973) was a Soviet violin pedagogue who taught many internationally known virtuosos during his long tenure at the Moscow Conservatory.

Life and career
Yuri Yankelevich was born in Basel, Switzerland. His father, Isay Leontyevich Yankelevich, a prominent lawyer, was one of the founders of the Omsk Philharmonic Society. In Omsk, young Yuri studied with Leopold Auer's student, Anisim Berlin, a grandfather of Natalia Gutman. In 1923 he entered Leningrad Conservatory, the class of Hovhaness Nalbandian (also a student of Leopold Auer). On Yankelevich's graduation composer Alexander Glazunov commented: "a career of a virtuoso violinist would certainly be his calling".  In 1932 he graduated from the Moscow Conservatory under professor Abram Yampolsky, and finished his doctorate degree in 1937. Between 1930 and 1937 he was an assistant concertmaster in the Moscow Philharmonic Orchestra, and afterwards concentrated primarily on pedagogical activities. Since 1934 he taught at the Moscow Conservatory School, the Moscow Conservatory College, and at the Moscow Conservatory senior division (first as Yampolsky's assistant, and later leading his own studio, eventually becoming a head of the violin department). He was also devoted to the theory of violin playing, creating a series of methodological publications. Yankelevich died in Moscow.

Notable students

Viktor Tretyakov
Ruben Aharonyan
Ilya Grubert
Grigori Zhislin
Leonid Kogan
Mikhail Kopelman
Boris Belkin
Vladimir Landsman
Albert Markov
Nelli Shkolnikova
Vladimir Spivakov
Levon Ambartsumian
Taras Gabora
Alexandre Brussilovsky
Mikhaïl Bezverkhny
Dora Schwarzberg
Vesna Stefanovich-Gruppman
Bohodar Kotorovych
Eva Graubin

Notes

References

 Roth, Henry (1997). Violin Virtuosos: From Paganini to the 21st Century. Los Angeles, CA: California Classics Books. 
 The Way They Play - S. Applebaum
 Yankelevitch International Violin Competition

1909 births
1973 deaths
Violin pedagogues
Russian classical violinists
Male classical violinists
Russian Jews
Jewish classical musicians
20th-century classical violinists
20th-century Russian male musicians